"Call It What You Want" is a song by American indie pop band Foster the People. It was released as the group's third single in December 2011 from their debut album Torches. The song was written by frontman Mark Foster and produced by Paul Epworth. The song was also featured in the soundtrack of the videogame FIFA 12 and the World Cup mode of FIFA 23.  The song appeared at number 14 on the Triple J Hottest 100, 2011 poll.

The song was remixed by (among others) Rizzle Kicks, who recorded their own music video for the track.

Composition
The song is an alternative rock and indie pop song with trippy sounding synthesizers and a piano accompanying the entire song with bass guitar and drums.

Music video
A music video to accompany the release of "Call It What You Want" was first released onto YouTube on November 1, 2011 at a total length of four minutes and two seconds. The music video begins with the phrase "Idle minds are the devil's workshop". The video consists of random, bizarre, strange sections, including singer Mark Foster pretending to shoot adoring fans with his right finger, drummer Mark Pontius floating while playing the drums, and the band running around outside while fireworks go off around them.

The music video was shot in Villa de Leon in Malibu, California.

Track listing

Personnel
Mark Foster – vocals, synthesizer, piano, Wurlitzer, programming
Cubbie Fink – bass, backing vocals
Mark Pontius – drums, backing vocals
Paul Epworth – percussion, keyboards, programming

Charts

Weekly charts

Certifications

Release history

References

External links

2011 singles
Foster the People songs
Song recordings produced by Paul Epworth
Songs written by Mark Foster (singer)
2011 songs